The women's 100m breaststroke SB7 event at the 2008 Summer Paralympics took place at the Beijing National Aquatics Center on 9 September. There were no heats in this event.

Final

Competed at 19:43.

 
WR = World Record.

References
 
 

Swimming at the 2008 Summer Paralympics
2008 in women's swimming